The Neptune Township School District (NTSD) or Neptune Township Schools are a comprehensive community public school district that serves students in pre-kindergarten through twelfth grade from Neptune Township, in Monmouth County, New Jersey, United States. The district is one of 31 former Abbott districts statewide that were established pursuant to the decision by the New Jersey Supreme Court in Abbott v. Burke which are now referred to as "SDA Districts" based on the requirement for the state to cover all costs for school building and renovation projects in these districts under the supervision of the New Jersey Schools Development Authority.

As of the 2018–19 school year, the district, comprised of eight schools, had an enrollment of 4,063 students and 372.0 classroom teachers (on a full-time equivalent basis), for a student–teacher ratio of 10.9:1.

The district is classified by the New Jersey Department of Education as being in District Factor Group "CD", the sixth-highest of eight groupings. District Factor Groups organize districts statewide to allow comparison by common socioeconomic characteristics of the local districts. From lowest socioeconomic status to highest, the categories are A, B, CD, DE, FG, GH, I and J.

History
Previously the school district did segregation of students by race. In 1948 however the elementary school and its teaching staff were racially integrated.

Schools
Schools in the district (with 2018–19 enrollment data from the National Center for Education Statistics) are:
Pre-school
Early Childhood Center (228 students; in grade PreK)
Dr. Lori Burns, Principal
Elementary schools
Gables School (269; PreK-5)
Joshua Loveland, Principal
Green Grove School (350; PreK-5)
James Nulle, Principal
Midtown Community School (379; K-5)
Dr. Mark Alfone, Principal
Shark River Hills School (264; PreK-5)
Janelle D. Opoku, Principal
Summerfield School (465; PreK-5)
Dr. Jerard Terrell, Principal
Middle school
Neptune Middle School (721; 6-8)
Dr. Arlene Rogo, Principal
High school (9-12)
Neptune High School (1,317; 9-12)
Kevin McCarthy, Principal

Administration
Core members of the district's administration are:
Dr. Tami Crader, Superintendent of Schools
Peter J. Leonard, Business Administrator / Board Secretary

Former Superintendent of Schools David A. Mooij died on June 21, 2015, just ten days prior to his announced retirement.

Board of education
The district's board of education, comprised of nine members, sets policy and oversees the fiscal and educational operation of the district through its administration. As a Type II school district, the board's trustees are elected directly by voters to serve three-year terms of office on a staggered basis, with three seats up for election each year held as part of the April school election. The board appoints a superintendent to oversee the district's day-to-day operations and a business administrator to supervise the business functions of the district. As one of the 13 districts statewide with school elections in April, voters also decide on passage of the annual school budget.

References

External links
Neptune Township Schools

School Data for the Neptune Township Schools, National Center for Education Statistics

Neptune Township, New Jersey
New Jersey Abbott Districts
New Jersey District Factor Group CD
School districts in Monmouth County, New Jersey